SS Unity was a freight vessel built for the Co-operative Wholesale Society Limited in 1902.

History

Unity was built by Murdoch and Murray Port Glasgow for the Co-operative Wholesale Society and launched on 1 November 1902.

Unity was obtained in 1905 by the Lancashire and Yorkshire Railway.

References

1902 ships
Ships built on the River Clyde
Steamships of the United Kingdom
Ships of the Lancashire and Yorkshire Railway
Maritime incidents in 1918
Ships sunk by German submarines in World War I
World War I shipwrecks in the English Channel